The Gruna is a small river of Saxony, Germany. It is a right tributary of the Wesenitz, which it joins in Großharthau.

See also
List of rivers of Saxony

Rivers of Saxony
Rivers of Germany